The Gabonese Air Force is the official aerial warfare branch of the Armed Forces of Gabon.

History
In the early 1960s, following the country's independence from the French Republic, aerial detachments were inside the country, with the first official aerial installation being the Mouila Training Center which was established in 1966 in the south-west of the country. On January 25, 1972, by presidential decree signed by President Omar Bongo, the Gabonese Air Force became an official branch of the armed forces, separate from the army. In January 1980, at the initiative of President Bongo, the Air Force developed and adopted a combat structure, acquiring a fleet of fighters, and creating the Mvengue Air Base in the capital.

Order of battle
 Fighter Squadron 1-02 Leyou at BA02 Franceville with:
 Mirage F-1AZ
 MB-326M Impala I
 Heavy Transport Squadron at BA01 Libreville with:
 C-130 Hercules
 CN-235
 Ministerial Air Liaison Group ( or GLAM) at BA01 Libreville with:
 1 Falcon-900EX
 1 Gulfstream III

Current inventory

Retired aircraft 
Previous aircraft operated by the Air Force consisted of the  CM.170 Magister, C-130H Hercules,  Embraer EMB 110,  Fokker F28, Aérospatiale N 262, Reims C.337, and the Alouette II helicopter. The first fighters flown by the air force were Dassault Mirage 5Gs.

References

Bibliography

Military of Gabon
Air forces by country
air force
Military aviation in Africa